"Made in Japan" is a 1972 single by Buck Owens.  "Made in Japan" was Buck Owens' last number one on the country chart as a solo artist.  The single stayed at number one for a single week and spent a total of thirteen weeks on the chart.

Charts

References
 

1972 singles
Buck Owens songs
Capitol Records singles